The 1989 Segunda División de Chile was the 38th season of the Segunda División de Chile.

Universidad de Chile was the tournament's champion.

Aggregate table

North Zone

South Zone

Final stage

North Zone - Promotion Playoffs

North Zone - Relegation Playoffs

South Zone - Promotion Playoffs

Liguilla de Descenso Sur

See also
Chilean football league system

References

External links
 RSSSF - List of Second Division Champions

Segunda División de Chile (1952–1995) seasons
Primera B
1989 in South American football leagues